The Anna Freud Centre (now renamed the Anna Freud National Centre for Children and Families) is a child mental health research, training and treatment centre located in London, United Kingdom. The Centre aims to transform current mental health provision in the UK by improving the quality, accessibility and effectiveness of treatment, bringing together leaders in neuroscience, mental health, social care and education. It is closely associated with University College London (UCL) and Yale University. The Princess of Wales currently serves as its royal patron.

History
The Hampstead Child Therapy Course was started by Anna Freud in 1947. Students included Joyce McDougall, who had her first experience of intensive analysis with children whilst on the course. The Hampstead Child Therapy Course and Clinic was founded in 1952 by Anna Freud, Dorothy Burlingham, and Helen Ross, becoming the first child psychoanalytic centre for observational research, teaching and learning. The Hampstead Child Therapy Course and Clinic was established as a charity with the purpose of providing training, treatment and research in child psychoanalysis. After Anna Freud's death in 1982, the Centre was renamed the "Anna Freud Centre".

The Centre's current Directors, Linda Mayes, Peter Fonagy, and Mary Target, were appointed in 2003. Their aim has been to secure the Anna Freud Centre's position as the leading psychoanalytic innovator and provider of mental health treatment to children and families in Europe.

In June 2003 a study conducted jointly by the Anna Freud Centre, Great Ormond Street Hospital and Coram Family Adoption Services on the way in which abused children can have their faith in adults restored through adoption was published. In September 2009 a collaborative project involving the Anna Freud Centre, Kids Company and UCL was launched to study what happens to the brains of children who have suffered early trauma. In May 2010 a campaign was launched by the charity Kids Company to raise £5 million to fund a study into how children's brain development is affected by loving care and attachment, with the study work to be conducted by the Anna Freud Centre in partnership with the Institute of Psychiatry, UCL, the Tavistock Clinic and Oxford University.

Activities

Treatment
The Centre provides short-term and long-term specialist treatments for children suffering from mental illnesses.

Research
The Centre conducts research in collaboration with the Yale University Child Study Center and the Menninger Department of Psychiatry at Baylor College of Medicine. The Centre's historic links with Yale University have been renewed through the recently established Anna Freud Centre/Yale Child Study Center Bridge Programme. Research teams from the Menninger Department of Psychiatry, the Anna Freud Centre and Yale Child Study Center form a developmental and clinical psychoanalytically-inspired research consortium.

The Centre also hosts the Child and Adolescent Mental Health Services (CAMHS) Evidence Based Practice Unit, an interdisciplinary research unit which is part of University College London. Its research focuses on supporting the implementation of evidence-based practice and also gathering practice-based evidence for mental health interventions. Current projects include a national evaluation of therapies (part of the Children and Young People's Improving Access to Psychological Therapies programme); research on shared decision making; and the development of models for resource need as part of the CAMHS Payment by Results project.

Teaching
The Centre offers the following certificate, diploma and MSc courses:

MRes (previously MSc) in Developmental Neuroscience & Psychopathology (in collaboration with UCL and Yale University; Child Study Center). This course was established in 2006 as part of the new Anna Freud Centre/Yale Child Study Center Bridge Programme and addresses a growing interest among both neuroscientists and developmental scholars in integrating ideas of social-emotional development with contemporary understanding of brain development and brain function. It consists of one year of teaching at the Anna Freud Centre/UCL, and one year or independent research at the Yale Child Study Center/Yale University.
MSc in Psychoanalytic Developmental Psychology (in collaboration with UCL). The course combines theoretical consideration of psychoanalytic perspectives on developmental issues and inter-family relationships with year-long observations of infants and children.
MSc in Developmental Psychology & Clinical Practice
UCL Post Graduate Certificate/Post Graduate Diploma/MSc in Cognitive Behaviour Therapy and other Outcomes-Based Interventions. These new UCL programmes are intended for all professionals working in children's services, including social care, education and health.
PGCert in ‘Leadership and change’ new from Jan 2020

The Centre also offers an extensive range of short courses.

Library
The Anna Freud Centre Library supports the academic, clinical and research activities at the Centre. It currently holds approximately 2,000 books covering both historical and contemporary psychoanalytic material, and subscribes to 22 journal titles. Electronic access to research publications is also available.

Alumni
Alumni include Erna Furman.

See also
Anna Freud
Psychoanalytic Study of the Child
Freud Museum
Child Guidance

References

External links
Anna Freud National Centre for Children and Families
Baylor College of Medicine
UCL Psychoanalysis Unit
University College London
Yale Child Study Center
Yale University

Health in London
University College London
Research institutes established in 1952
Psychiatric research institutes
1952 establishments in England
Pediatric organizations
Educational institutions established in 1952